Electro World is an electronics online retailer founded in 2002 and operating in Sweden. It also operated in Czech Republic, Slovakia, Poland, Greece and Turkey, as a subsidiary of Currys plc (formerly DSG International, then Dixons Carphone), until operations in those countries were sold off.

Electro World operated stores in some countries, and was online-only in others. It arrived in Sweden as an online brand, replacing the PC City website there. PC City's physical stores in Sweden had already been closed down in 2009.

In 2009, the Polish Electro World operation was sold by DSG International to Mix Electronics.

In September 2013, Dixons Retail announced that they would sell the Electro World operations in Turkey to Bimeks. Electro World in Turkey was subsequently integrated into Bimeks. 

Dixons Retail agreed in May 2014 to sell Electro World in the Czech Republic and Slovakia to Nay.

The online Electro World operations in Greece have been merged with Dixons Retail's existing business Kotsovolos.

References

External links
 electroworld.com - Pan-European gateway for Czech, Slovak, Greek, Turkish and Swedish sites

Consumer electronics retailers
Currys plc
Retail companies established in 2002